MTV Rocks Europe was a European pay television music channel from Viacom International Media Networks Europe that was launched on 27 May 2014, replacing the British version of MTV Rocks in Europe.

History 
On 17 November 2015, MTV Rocks Europe was removed from CanalSat.

On 1 October 2017, the European versions of MTV Rocks, MTV Dance and MTV Hits ceased broadcasting in Benelux.

On 4 October 2018, the channel was removed from Numericable along with MTV Dance Europe following the launch of Comedy Central France.

In 2019, the channel disappeared in Portugal.

On 2 May 2020, it was removed from Sky Italia.

The channel closed along with VH1 Classic Europe in October 2020 and was replaced by MTV 90s, after its British equivalent had closed three months earlier. MTV 90s was first launched on 27 May 2016 in the UK and Ireland as a temporary rebranding of MTV Classic UK until 24 June 2016. 

The last video to be broadcast on MTV Rocks Europe was "Bullet Holes" by Bush.

Programmes
Biggest! Hottest! Loudest!
Supermassive Anthems!
Rocks Rated!
100% Anthems
Ultimate Rock Playlist!
This Week's Rock Solid Playlist
Smells Like The 90s!

References

External links
 TV Guide
 MTV Rocks Europe - presentation, screenshots
 Společnost MTV Networks získala licenci pro tři další kanály

MTV channels
Television channels and stations established in 2014
Television channels and stations disestablished in 2020